Viva el lunes (English: Live the Monday) was a Chilean TV show, transmitted by Canal 13 for 11 seasons, from October 16, 1995 to January 29, 2001. The TV hosts were Miss Universe 1987 and ex-newsreader Cecilia Bolocco, comedian Álvaro Salas, and businessman and TV host Kike Morandé.

After the end of the show, Morandé went to Mega, where he began a late night show, Morandé con Compañía, followed by Salas.

The Studio 3 that was used by Viva el Lunes today is called "Gonzalo Bertrán Studio", in honor of the show's director, who died on January 30, 2001, one day after the last episode. This studio was used by other late night shows such as Nace una estrella (2000-2001), El lunes sin falta (2001), Por fin es lunes (2002-2003), Aquí se pasa Mundial (2002), Vértigo (2003-2008), and Mucho Lucho (2003-2006).

In 2014, Viva el lunes was retransmited in Rec TV. On November 16, 2015, Canal 13 released ReViva El Lunes, a compilation of the best of 6 years from the show,.

The show launched the stardom of Brazilian singer Xuxa.

References 

Chilean television talk shows
1990s Chilean television series
2000s Chilean television series
1995 Chilean television series debuts
2001 Chilean television series endings